"Too Hot to Sleep" is a song written by R.C. Bannon and John Bettis, and recorded by American country music artist Louise Mandrell.  It was released in July 1983 as the first single and title track from the album Too Hot to Sleep.  The song reached number 10 on the Billboard Hot Country Singles & Tracks chart.

Chart performance

References

1983 singles
1983 songs
Louise Mandrell songs
Songs with lyrics by John Bettis
Songs written by R.C. Bannon
RCA Records singles
Song recordings produced by Eddie Kilroy